Fontana North is a Canadian record distribution company and represents the Canadian wing of Fontana Distribution. It is a joint venture between Canadian-based Cadence Music Group and US-based Fontana Distribution. The company was established by MapleCore in 2004 as MapleNationwide, and in 2006, it partnered with Fontana Distribution and was rebranded as Fontana North. It has expanded throughout Canada for pan-Canadian distribution of many music labels. On August 22, 2013 it was announced that they would be teaming up with Distort Entertainment in a joint venture deal with Fontana North acting as the main distributor of the hardcore label.

Fontana North won the Independent Distributor of the Year award six years in a row (2008 - 2013) at the Canadian Music Industry Awards, held annually in Toronto as part of Canadian Music Week.

Distributed labels
Fontana North is affiliated with more than 80 labels, including the following:

 2+2 Management
 AAO Music
 Alligator Records
 Astral Music
 ATO Records
 Bad Taste Records
 Black Box Recordings
 Black Hen Music
 Bumstead Productions
 Cobraside Distribution
 Cooperative Music
 Cordova Bay Records
 Dangerbird Records
 Distort Entertainment
 Downtown Records
 Daptone Records
 Domo Records
 Drive Records
 Drip Audio
 Eleven Seven Music
 Epitaph Records
 Endearing Records
 Fearless Records
 Fierce Panda Canada
 Filter Records
 Half-Life Records
 Heads Connect Entertainment
 Hieroglyphics
 High Tide Music
 Hopeless Records
 High 4 Records
 Hi-Bias Recordings
 Indica Records
 Ipecac Recordings
 j.k. livin' Records
 Latent Recordings
 Lex Records
 Luaka Bop
 Mad Decent
 Mailboat Records
 Make It Real Records
 MapleMusic Recordings
 Masalacism Records
 MB3 Records
 Ministry of Sound
 Modular Records
 Mom + Pop Music
 Mr Bongo Records
 Musical Freedom
 Metal Blade Records
 Napalm Records
 Nevado Records
 Nuclear Blast
 Palm Pictures
 Paper Bag Records
 PH Recordings
 Pheromone Recordings
 PHI Grou
 PIAS Recordings
 Pipe & Hat
 Play Records
 Polar Bear Records
 Rainbow Quartz
 Rasa Music
 RBC Records
 Red Floor Records
 Red Telephone Box Records
 Rekords Rekords
 Rhymesayers Entertainment
 Rise Records
 Rocket Science Records
 Road Angel Records
 Salt X Records
 Sandbag Records
 Sumerian Records
 Shangri-La Records
 SideOneDummy Records
 Shoreline Entertainment
 Slaight Music
 Sonic Unyon Distribution
 Song Dog Music
 Sound of Pop
 Soul Kiss Entertainment
 Strange Music
 System Recordings
 TBD Records
 Tee Pee Records
 Tompkins Square Records
 Tonic Records
 Turtlemusik
 Upper Class Recordings
 Underground Operations
 URBNET Records
 Victory Records
 Vagrant Records
 VH1 Classics
 Warp Records
 Warcon Enterprises
 William Morris Endeavor
 Wrasse Records
 Yazoo Record Group
 YYZ Records

Some labels listed here have only selected titles distributed through Fontana North.

Direct-distribution artists
A small selection of artists are technically "unsigned", but distribute their records independently through Fontana North, including:
 Donovan Woods
 Jeremy Dutcher
 Jordan Klassen
 Lindi Ortega
 Snotty Nose Rez Kids

Awards and accolades

Canadian Music Awards
The Canadian Music and Broadcast Industry Awards happen every March in Toronto as part of Canadian Music Week.

|-
| 2008 || Fontana North || Independent Distributor of the Year || 
|-
| 2009 || Fontana North || Independent Distributor of the Year || 
|-
| 2010 || Fontana North || Independent Distributor of the Year || 
|-
| 2011 || Fontana North || Independent Distributor of the Year || 
|-
| 2012 || Fontana North || Independent Distributor of the Year || 
|-
| 2013 || Fontana North || Independent Distributor of the Year || 
|-

Juno Awards
The Juno Awards are presented by the Canadian Academy of Recording Arts and Sciences.

|-
|rowspan="9"|  || Neverending White Lights || New Artist of the Year || 
|-
|| Arabesque The Frenzy Of Renown || Rap Recording of the Year || 
|-
|| Classified Hitch Hikin’ Music || Rap Recording of the Year || 
|-
|| DL Incognito Organic Music For A Digital World || Rap Recording of the Year || 
|-
|| Lori Cullen Calling For Rain || Vocal Jazz Album of the Year || 
|-
|| George Believe || R&B/Soul Recording of the Year || 
|-
|| Karl Wolf Face Behind The Face || R&B/Soul Recording of the Year || 
|-
|| Lennie Gallant When We Get There || Roots & Traditional Album of the Year: Solo || 
|-
|| David Gogo Acoustic || Blues Album of the Year || 
|-
|rowspan="2"|  || Shad The Old Prince || Rap Recording of the Year || 
|-
|| Bob Lanois Snake Road || Instrumental Album of the Year || 
|-
|rowspan="7"|  || Inhabitants The Furniture Moves Underneath || Instrumental Album of the Year || 
|-
|| Steve Dawson Telescope || Instrumental Album of the Year || 
|-
|| D-Sisive The Book || Rap Recording of the Year || 
|-
|| DL Incognito A Captured Moment In Time || Rap Recording of the Year || 
|-
|| Old Man Luedecke Proof Of Love || Roots & Traditional Album of the Year: Solo || 
|-
|| Daniel Lanois|| Jack Richardson Producer of the Year || 
|-
|| Daniel Lanois Here Is What Is || Music DVD of the Year || 
|-
|rowspan="11"|  || Carly Rae Jepsen || New Artist of the Year || 
|-
|| Carly Rae Jepsen & Ryan Stewart || Songwriter of the Year || 
|-
|| Danny Fernandes || New Artist of the Year || 
|-
|| Ten Second Epic || New Group of the Year || 
|-
|| Julie Doiron I Can Wonder What You Did With Your Day || Alternative Album of the Year || 
|-
|| Pavlo, Rik Emmett, Oscar Lopez Trifecta || Instrumental Album of the Year || 
|-
|| Danny Fernandes INTRO || R&B/Soul Album of the Year || 
|-
|| Bahamas Pink Strat || Roots & Traditional Album of the Year: Solo|| 
|-
|| John Wort Hannam Queen's Hotel || Roots & Traditional Album of the Year: Solo || 
|-
|| Good Lovelies Good Lovelies || Roots & Traditional Album of the Year: Group || 
|-
|| Matt Brouwer Where's Our Revolution || Contemporary Christian/Gospel Album of the Year || 
|-
|rowspan="10"|  || Fond of Tigers Continent & Western || Instrumental Album of the Year || 
|-
|| D-Sisive Vaudeville || Rap Recording of the Year || 
|-
|| Shad TSOL || Rap Recording of the Year || 
|-
|| Raghav ft. Kardinal Offishall So Much || R&B/Soul Recording of the Year || 
|-
|| Dubmatix System Shakedown || Reggae Recording of the Year || 
|-
|| Joey Stylez The Black Star || Aboriginal Album of the Year || 
|-
|| Old Man Luedecke My Hands Are On Fire and Other Love Songs || Roots & Traditional Album of the Year: Solo || 
|-
|| Jim Byrnes Everywhere West || Blues Album of the Year || 
|-
|| Greg Sczebel Love & the Lack Thereof || Contemporary Christian/Gospel Album of the Year || 
|-
|| Manafest The Chase || Contemporary Christian/Gospel Album of the Year || 
|-
|rowspan="12"|  || JRDN || New Artist of the Year || 
|-
|| JRDN IAMJRDN || R&B/Soul Recording of the Year || 
|-
|| The Rural Alberta Advantage || New Group of the Year || 
|-
|| The Rural Alberta Advantage Stamp || Video of the Year || 
|-
|| Jimmy Rankin Forget About the World || Country Album of the Year || 
|-
|| Cuff The Duke Morning Comes || Adult Alternative Album of the Year || 
|-
|| Bobs & Lolo Connecting the Dots || Children's Album of the Year || 
|-
|| D-Sisive Jonestown 2: Jimmy Go Bye Bye || Rap Recording of the Year || 
|-
|| Dubmatix Seeds of Love & Life ft. Luciano || Reggae Recording of the Year || 
|-
|| Dave Gunning A Tribute To John Allan Cameron || Roots & Traditional Album of the Year: Solo || 
|-
|| David Gogo Soul-Bender || Blues Album of the Year || 
|-
|| Austra Feel It Break || Electronic Album of the Year || 
|-
|rowspan="8"|  || Ex Dio Caligvla || Metal/Hard Music Album of the Year: Group || 
|-
|| Manafest Fighter || Contemporary Christian/Gospel Album of the Year || 
|-
|| The Wooden Sky Every Child A Daughter, Every Moon A Sun || Roots & Traditional Album of the Year: Group || 
|-
|| The Strumbellas My Father and the Hunter || Roots & Traditional Album of the Year: Group || 
|-
|| Elliot BROOD Days Into Years || Roots & Traditional Album of the Year: Group || 
|-
|| Crystal Shawanda Just Like You || Aboriginal Album of the Year || 
|-
|| Ratchet Orchestra Hemlock || Instrumental Album of the Year || 
|-
|| Kristina Maria Tell The World || Pop Album of the Year || 
|-

References

External links
 Fontana North official website
 Fontana Distribution official website
 Cadence Music Group official website

Record label distributors
Canadian independent record labels
Record labels established in 2004
2006 in Canadian music